Nagbabagang Luha (International title: Flames of Love / is a 2021 Philippine television drama series broadcast by GMA Network. The series is based on a 1988 Philippine film of the same title. Directed by Ricky Davao, it stars Glaiza de Castro and Claire Castro. It premiered on August 2, 2021 on the network's Afternoon Prime line up. The series concluded on October 23, 2021 with a total of 72 episodes. It was replaced by Las Hermanas in its timeslot.

The series is streaming online on YouTube.

Cast and characters

Lead cast
 Glaiza de Castro as Maria Theresa "Maita" Ignacio-Montaire
 Claire Castro as Cielo Narissa Ignacio

Supporting cast
 Rayver Cruz as Alexander "Alex" Montaire
 Mike Tan as Aidan "Bien" de Dios-Ignacio
 Gina Alajar as Calida Montaire
 Allan Paule as Rafael "Paeng" Ignacio
 Myrtle Sarrosa as Judy Enriquez
 Archie Adamos as Levi de Dios
 Royce Cabrera as Sherwin Enriquez
 Karenina Haniel as Monina de Castro
 Ralph Noriega as Joryl
 Bryan Benedict as Lander

Guest cast
 Jaclyn Jose as Mercy Ignacio

Production
Principal photography commenced in February 2021.

Ratings
According to AGB Nielsen Philippines' Nationwide Urban Television Audience Measurement People in television homes, the pilot episode of Nagbabagang Luha earned a 6.2% rating, while the final episode scored a 7.5% rating.

References

External links
 
 

2021 Philippine television series debuts
2021 Philippine television series endings
Filipino-language television shows
GMA Network drama series
Live action television shows based on films
Television shows set in the Philippines